"The Mountain's High" is a 1961 hit R&B song written and performed by the California duo Dick and Dee Dee.

Background
The song has unusual special characteristics, being - at least in part - pentatonic. The instrumentation consists of two alternating minor bass-chords, played at the very bottom of the pitch-range of an electric-guitar. The guitar is minor-open-tuned.  For most of the song, the two bass-chords are played in descending order, but for the alternative sections, two different bass-chords are played in ascending order.

Each of the two singers (who co-wrote the song) recorded two vocal tracks.  It featured Dick St. John Gosting's overdubbed falsetto and Dee Dee Phelps's harmony. Produced by the Wilder Brothers and Don Ralke, it was released as the B-side of "I Want Someone". It was flipped inadvertently by a San Francisco DJ and became an immediate hit with local listeners. Liberty Records of Los Angeles soon signed on the artists for national distribution.

Chart performance
"The Mountain's High" reached the #2 spot in September 1961 on the Billboard Hot 100 and spent two weeks there, held out of #1 by Bobby Vee's "Take Good Care of My Baby", also released by Liberty Records.  It also reached #37 on the UK Singles Chart.

Cover versions
French band "Les Chaussettes Noires" (with lead singer Eddy Mitchell) released a French language version in 1962 titled "Non Ne Lui Dis Pas" (No Don't Tell Him).

References

1961 songs
1961 debut singles
Dick and Dee Dee songs
Liberty Records singles
London Records singles